= Buengui River =

River in Gabon

Coordinates: 3°17′00″S 11°38′00″E

The Buengui River is a small river of Gabon.
